Ernesto Mario Chaves (8 June 1929 – 24 August 2007) was an Argentine swimmer who competed at the 1948 Summer Olympics in the 100 m backstroke reaching the final and finishing 4th.

References

Swimmers at the 1948 Summer Olympics
Olympic swimmers of Argentina
Argentine male swimmers
2007 deaths
1929 births
Male backstroke swimmers
Sportspeople from Buenos Aires Province